Nicolas Alphonse Salin (5 July 1798 – 6 June 1878) was a French playwright and chansonnier.

Biography 
An employee at the Chancellery until 1830 and then at the Hôtel des Monnaies, Paris, where he became chief controller for coinage (1857), his plays were presented on the most important Parisian stages of the 19th century: Théâtre de la Porte Saint-Antoine, Théâtre de la Porte-Saint-Martin etc.

His songs were published in Le Caveau. He was made a knight of the Legion of honour on 13 August 1861

Works 
1823: L'Espagne délivrée, cantata
1836: L'Amour et l'homéopathie, vaudeville in 2 acts, with Adolphe Jadin and Henri de Tully
1839: Un cœur de  livres de rente, vaudeville n 1 act
1839: Une Matinée aux Prés Saint-Gervais, vaudeville en un acte, with Alfred Bouet
1839: Une nièce d'Amérique, vaudeville en 1 act
1839: Le Salon dans la mansarde, vaudeville in 1 act
1840: Dodore en pénitence, soliloquy-vaudeville in 1 act
1841: Les Mousquetaires, dramea vaudeville in 2 acts
1841: La Nièce du pasteur, comédie en vaudevilles in 2 acts
1841: L'Ange de la bienfaisance, song
1860: Santé portée à M. Richard Bérenger, commandant le 18e bataillon de la Garde nationale, song
1860: Les Reines du jour, song (Lire le texte sur Wikisource)
1866: Les Bottes neuves, song
undated: L'épouvantail, comédie en vaudevilles in 1 act, with Narcisse Fournier
1889: Mademoiselle !, chanson, music by Frédéric Boissière, posth.

Bibliography 
 Louis Gustave Vapereau, Dictionnaire universel des contemporains, 1861, (p. 1556)

References 

19th-century French dramatists and playwrights
French chansonniers
People from Montargis
1798 births
1878 deaths